The Individual Freedoms and Equality Committee (COLIBE, in French Commission des libertés individuelles et de l'égalité) is a commission created by the president of Tunisia Beji Caid Essebsi on 13 August 2017. The committee is in charge of preparing a report on legislative reforms concerning individual freedoms and equality in accordance with the Constitution of 2014 and international human rights standards.

Mission 
The committee is charged with contributing to the state of individual freedoms and equality in Tunisia through the preparation of a reform project in accordance with the requirements of the Tunisian Constitution of 2014 and international human rights standards.

Indeed, the Constitution includes a number of chapters on individual freedoms and the principles of equality, while many legislation and laws inherited from the French protectorate and the dictatorship are incompatible with the principles and spirit of contained changes.

Members 
The Individual Freedoms and Equality Committee is composed of nine members:

Work of the committee 
The work started since the first day, on the 14 August 2017, and the committee has drawn up an inventory of laws that undermine individual freedoms and equality and which are not in conformity with the Constitution and commitments of Tunisia in terms of human rights before entering in the proposal formulation phase.

Simultaneously, the committee has chosen to adopt a participative and consultative approach by inviting public life actors to contribute to the project. Through this approach, ministries, political parties represented in the Assembly of the Representatives of the People and government, specialized civil society organizations, academics specializing in several disciplines (sociologists, scholars of University of Ez-Zitouna, etc.) were consulted and their contributions helped to move the work of the committee forward significantly.

References

External links 
 Official website.

Human rights in Tunisia